Echinodorus tunicatus is a species of aquatic plants in the family Alismataceae.

In Rataj's taxonomy E. tunicatus is in Section Longipetali, Subgenus Echinodorus

Sometimes seen as Queen of Hearts

Description
Leaves upright, up to 90 cm long, blades distinctly cordate, 15 – 30 cm long x 10 – 23 cm wide, petioles glabrous or muricate under the blade. The pellucid lines, visible under magnification, form a network that is unrelated to the pattern of the veins.

Flowering stem tem 70 – 120 cm long, usually straight, cylindrical or costate below, triangular between the whorls. Inflorescence racemose, having 5 - 7 whorls containing 12 - 25 flowers each. Bracts at the base ovate and lengthened to a long point, up to 6 cm long with broad membranous margins. Pedicels 2 – 3 cm long, sepals green, later yellow with about 30 ribs, during ripening enlarging to a length of 10 – 12 mm and fully covering the aggregate fruit. Petals white, 5 – 8 mm long, corolla 1.6 - 1.8 cm in diameter, about 30 stamens. Aggregate fruit 1 - 1.5 cm in diameter, achenes claviform about 3 mm long x 1 mm wide, usually with 3 facial ribs and 3 glands in an oblique row in the upper half of the body. Stylar beak about 1 mm long.

Distribution
Central America. First gathered in Panama in 1908, but now also known from Brazil, Costa Rica, Colombia, Ecuador and Peru.

Propagated by division or adventitious plantlets.

See also
List of plants of Cerrado vegetation of Brazil

External links
 Echinodorus site

tenellus
Flora of Brazil
Flora of Costa Rica
Flora of Colombia
Flora of Ecuador
Flora of Peru
Flora of the Cerrado